The minister-president of Wallonia is the head of the Government of Wallonia, the executive power of Wallonia, one of the three regions of Belgium.

The official residence, known as the Élysette, is in Namur, along the Meuse River.

List of officeholders

Timeline

See also
 Prime Minister of Belgium
 Minister-President of the Brussels-Capital Region
 Minister-President of Flanders
 Minister-President of the French Community
 Minister-President of the German-speaking Community

References

1981 establishments in Belgium
Politics of Wallonia
Lists of political office-holders in Belgium